Walter Durdent (died 1159) was Bishop of Coventry from 1149 to 1159.

Durdent was a Benedictine monk before his elevation to the episcopate. He was prior of Christ Church Priory in Canterbury when he was elected to Coventry through the influence of Archbishop Theobald of Canterbury. Walter was consecrated as Bishop of Coventry on 2 October 1149. He was considered an excellent theologian. During his time as bishop, he forbade the practice of selling the chrism used in various ecclesiastical rituals.

Durdent died 7 December 1159.

Citations

References

Further reading

  

12th-century English Roman Catholic bishops
Bishops of Lichfield
1159 deaths
British Benedictines
Year of birth unknown